Jetzt erst recht ("Now more than ever") is the second studio album recorded by German pop rock singer LaFee.

Track listing 
 "Jetzt erst recht" – 4:09
 "Heul doch" – 4:02
 "Du bist schön" – 3:29
 "Der Regen fällt" – 4:36
 "Beweg dein Arsch" – 2:42
 "Wer bin ich" – 4:29
 "Küss mich" – 4:40
 "Zusammen" – 4:05
 "Stör ich" – 4:01
 "Für dich" – 3:48
 "Weg von dir" – 3:55
 "Heiß" – 3:26

Bravo Edition 
On 23 November 2007, a "Bravo Edition" of Jetzt erst recht was released, which contained the original songs in addition to several more.

 "Es tut weh" – 4:02
 "Warum" (Orchestra Version) – 3:57
 "Der Regen fällt" (Orchestra Version) – 4:12
 "Weg von dir" (Orchestra Version) – 3:53
 "Wer bin ich" (Orchestra Version) – 4:28
 "Sterben für dich" (Orchestra Version) – 3:03

Charts

Weekly charts

Year-end charts

Certifications

References 

2007 albums
LaFee albums
German-language albums